The 2011–12 Malmö Redhawks season was the Redhawks' 5th consecutive season in the HockeyAllsvenskan ice hockey league, the second tier of Swedish elite hockey. The regular season began on 17 September 2011 away against Mora IK, and concluded on 2 March 2012 away against Almtuna IS. The Playoff round began on 4 March and ended on 12 March 2012. The season saw Malmö Redhawks attempting to reach the Kvalserien qualification for Elitserien, after businessman Hugo Stenbeck bought the Redhawks in January 2011.

The Redhawks finished 7th in the league and qualified for the Playoff round, where they finished 2nd and failed to qualify for the 2012 Kvalserien for Elitserien.

Summary
The Redhawks started the season with eight pre-season games against professional teams from Norway and Germany as well as Sweden. Malmö went 5–2–1 in those eight games (5 wins, 2 losses, 1 tie).

The regular season began pretty well. With 29 points and a top 3 spot in the first two months, everything seemed to be going as intended as the Redhawks fought for a direct spot to the 2012 Kvalserien. However, after only getting 18 points in November, as well as beginning December with three consecutive losses, Malmö jumped down to a spot below top 7, which would have been required to even guarantee a playoff spot. Malmö had enough of then head coach Leif Strömberg, who was fired from the club on 10 December as a result. Ulf Taavola, at that time assistant coach for the team, took over the head-coaching job and Patrik Sylvegård entered the team as new assistant coach.

Malmö continued to struggle for a playoff spot throughout January, despite getting 10 points that month, five more than the previous month. The team improved sharply in February, posting 16 points in seven games. As a result, Malmö returned to a playoff spot. In the two last games of February, Malmö had their chance to secure a spot in the playoffs with a win, but failed. As a result, the Redhawks were forced to win the last game of the season, which was against Almtuna. The game was a nail-biter for 59 minutes, but with just one minute left on the clock, Malmö captain Linus Klasen scored the only goal of the game to send the Redhawks to the Playoff round.

The Playoff round started well, but because Malmö only received one extra point due to the 7th seed in the regular season, the Redhawks were two points outside the spot for the 2012 Kvalserien going into the final game. While Malmö won their game 4–1, Rögle won their game 7–0 and took the Kvalserien spot due to better goal difference than Malmö, ending the Redhawks' 2011–12 season.

Schedule and results
"@" indicates that the game was played on away ice.

Pre-season

|- align="center" bgcolor="#CCFFCC"
| 1 || August 11 || Sparta Sarpsborg || 4-0 || Toivonen || 1–0–0
|- align="center" bgcolor="#CCFFCC"
| 2 || August 12 || @ SønderjyskE || 3-2 || Toivonen || 2–0–0
|- align="center" bgcolor="#F9F077"
| 3 || August 20 ||  @ Växjö Lakers || 2-2 || Toivonen || 2–0–1
|- align="center" bgcolor="#CCFFCC"
| 4 || August 24 || @ Sparta Sarpsborg || 4-1 || Sjögren || 3–0–1
|- align="center" bgcolor="#FFBBBB"
| 5 || August 26 || Hamburg Freezers || 1-3 || Toivonen || 3–1–1
|- align="center" bgcolor="#CCFFCC"
| 6 || September 3 || @ Hannover Scorpions || 5-2 || Sjögren || 4–1–1
|- align="center" bgcolor="#FFBBBB"
| 7 || September 8 || Växjö Lakers || 1-2 || Toivonen || 4–2–1
|- align="center" bgcolor="#CCFFCC"
| 8 || September 11 || @ Hamburg Freezers || 5-3 || Sjögren || 5–2–1

Legend: 

|}

Regular season

|- align="center" bgcolor="#CCFFCC"
| 1 || 17  || @ Mora || 4-3 || Toivonen || 1-0-0
|- align="center" bgcolor="#CCFFCC"
| 2 || 19  || Bofors || 5-0 || Sjögren || 2-0-0
|- align="center" bgcolor="#FFBBBB"
| 3 || 24 || Västerås  || 2-6 || Toivonen || 2-1-0
|- align="center" bgcolor="#CCFFCC"
| 4 || 26 || @ Rögle || 5-2 || Sjögren || 3-1-0
|- align="center" bgcolor="#CCFFCC"
| 5 || 28 || Tingsryd || 4-1 || Sjögren || 4-1-0
|- align="center" bgcolor="#CCFFCC"
| 6 || 30 || @ Sundsvall || 3-2 || Sjögren || 5-1-0

|- align="center" bgcolor="#CCFFCC"
| 7 || 5 || @ Leksand || 3-1 || Toivonen || 6-1-0
|- align="center" bgcolor="#FFBBBB"
| 8 || 7 || @ Troja/Ljungby || 2-4 || Toivonen || 6-2-0
|- align="center" bgcolor="#CCFFCC"
| 9 || 10 || Oskarshamn || 6-2 || Sjögren || 7-2-0
|- align="center" bgcolor="#FFBBBB"
| 10 || 14 || @ Örebro || 3-6 || Sjögren || 7-3-0
|- align="center" bgcolor="#DDFFDD"
| 11 || 19 || Södertälje || 3-2 SO || Toivonen || 7-3-1
|- align="center" bgcolor="#CCFFCC"
| 12 || 22 || Borås || 4-2 || Toivonen || 8-3-1
|- align="center" bgcolor="#CCFFCC"
| 13 || 26 || Almtuna || 3-0 || Toivonen || 9-3-1
|- align="center" bgcolor="#FFBBBB"
| 14 || 28 || @ Bofors || 2-3 || Sjögren || 9-4-1

|- align="center" bgcolor="#FFBBBB"
| 15 || 2 || Rögle || 2-4 || Toivonen || 9-5-1
|- align="center" bgcolor="#FFBBBB"
| 16 || 4 || @ Tingsryd || 3-4 || Toivonen || 9-6-1
|- align="center" bgcolor="#FFDDDD"
| 17 || 6 || Sundsvall || 3-4 SO || Sjögren || 9-6-2
|- align="center" bgcolor="#CCFFCC"
| 18 || 8 || Leksand || 3-1 || Sjögren || 10-6-2
|- align="center" bgcolor="#FFBBBB"
| 19 || 10 || @ Västerås || 1-4 || Sjögren || 10-7-2
|- align="center" bgcolor="#CCFFCC"
| 20 || 14 || Troja/Ljungby || 3-2 || Sjögren || 11-7-2
|- align="center" bgcolor="#DDFFDD"
| 21 || 16 || @ Oskarshamn || 4-3 SO || Sjögren || 11-7-3
|- align="center" bgcolor="#CCFFCC"
| 22 || 18 || Örebro || 5-4 || Toivonen || 12-7-3
|- align="center" bgcolor="#FFBBBB"
| 23 || 21 || @ Södertälje || 1-4 || Toivonen || 12-8-3
|- align="center" bgcolor="#CCFFCC"
| 24 || 24 || @ Borås || 3-1 || Sjögren || 13-8-3
|- align="center" bgcolor="#FFBBBB"
| 25 || 26 || Mora || 2-5 || Sjögren || 13-9-3
|- align="center" bgcolor="#CCFFCC"
| 26 || 30 || @ Almtuna || 4-1 || Sjögren || 14-9-3

|- align="center" bgcolor="#FFBBBB"
| 27 || 2 || @ Bofors || 2-5 || Sjögren || 14-10-3
|- align="center" bgcolor="#FFBBBB"
| 28 || 6 || Västerås || 0-2 || Sjögren || 14-11-3
|- align="center" bgcolor="#FFBBBB"
| 29 || 8 || @ Rögle || 2-4 || Sjögren || 14-12-3
|- align="center" bgcolor="#FFBBBB"
| 30 || 10 || Tingsryd || 1-2 || Sjögren || 14-13-3
|- align="center" bgcolor="#DDFFDD"
| 31 || 14 || @ Sundsvall || 4-3 SO || Sjögren || 14-13-4
|- align="center" bgcolor="#FFBBBB"
| 32 || 19 || Leksand || 1-2 || Sjögren || 14-14-4
|- align="center" bgcolor="#FFBBBB"
| 33 || 27 || @ Troja/Ljungby || 1-3 || Sjögren || 14-15-4
|- align="center" bgcolor="#CCFFCC"
| 34 || 29 || Oskarshamn || 5-2 || Toivonen || 15-15-4

|- align="center" bgcolor="#FFBBBB"
| 35 || 6 || @ Örebro || 1-2 || Toivonen || 15-16-4
|- align="center" bgcolor="#FFDDDD"
| 36 || 8 || Södertälje || 2-3 SO || Toivonen || 15-16-5
|- align="center" bgcolor="#FFBBBB"
| 37 || 14 || Borås || 4-5 || Toivonen || 15-17-5
|- align="center" bgcolor="#CCFFCC"
| 38 || 16 || Almtuna || 3-2 || Sjögren || 16-17-5
|- align="center" bgcolor="#FFDDDD"
| 39 || 18 || @ Mora || 4-5 OT || Toivonen || 16-17-6
|- align="center" bgcolor="#CCFFCC"
| 40 || 25 || Bofors || 2-1 || Sjögren || 17-17-6
|- align="center" bgcolor="#FFBBBB"
| 41 || 28 || @ Västerås || 2-5 || Sjögren || 17-18-6
|- align="center" bgcolor="#DDFFDD"
| 42 || 30 || Rögle || 3-2 SO || Sjögren || 17-18-7

|- align="center" bgcolor="#CCFFCC"
| 43 || 1 || @ Tingsryd || 3-0 || Sjögren || 18-18-7
|- align="center" bgcolor="#CCFFCC"
| 44 || 3 || Sundsvall || 2-1 || Sjögren || 19-18-7
|- align="center" bgcolor="#FFBBBB"
| 45 || 6 || @ Leksand || 0-6 || Toivonen || 19-19-7
|- align="center" bgcolor="#CCFFCC"
| 46 || 15 || Troja/Ljungby || 3-1 || Sjögren || 20-19-7
|- align="center" bgcolor="#DDFFDD"
| 47 || 17 || @ Oskarshamn || 3-2 SO || Sjögren || 20-19-8
|- align="center" bgcolor="#DDFFDD"
| 48 || 19 || Örebro || 2-1 OT || Sjögren || 20-19-9
|- align="center" bgcolor="#CCFFCC"
| 49 || 24 || @ Södertälje || 3-2 || Sjögren || 21-19-9
|- align="center" bgcolor="#FFBBBB"
| 50 || 27 || @ Borås || 1-4 || Sjögren || 21-20-9
|- align="center" bgcolor="#FFBBBB"
| 51 || 29 || Mora || 1-4 || Sjögren || 21-21-9

|- align="center" bgcolor="#CCFFCC"
| 52 || 2 || @ Almtuna || 1-0 || Sjögren || 22-21-9

Legend: 

|}

Playoff round
In the Playoff round, the 4th seed starts at four points, the 5th seed at three points, the 6th seed at two points, and the 7th seed at one point. As Malmö were the 7th-seeded team, they started at one point. The top team after six rounds advances to the 2012 Kvalserien.

|- align="center" bgcolor="#FFBBBB"
| 1 || 4 || Västerås || 3-5 || Sjögren || 0–1–0
|- align="center" bgcolor="#CCFFCC"
| 2 || 6 || @ Rögle || 3-1 || Sjögren || 1-1-0
|- align="center" bgcolor="#CCFFCC"
| 3 || 7 || @ Oskarshamn || 4-2 || Sjögren || 2-1-0
|- align="center" bgcolor="#FFBBBB"
| 4 || 9 || Oskarshamn || 0-1 || Sjögren || 2-2-0
|- align="center" bgcolor="#CCFFCC"
| 5 || 11 || Rögle || 5-3 || Sjögren || 3-2-0
|- align="center" bgcolor="#CCFFCC"
| 6 || 12 || @ Västerås || 4-1 || Sjögren || 4–2–0

Statistics

Players

Goaltenders

Final roster 

|}

References 

Malmo
Malmö Redhawks seasons